The Politics of Religious Apostasy: The Role of Apostates in the Transformation of Religious Movements is a 1998 book edited by David G. Bromley. It presents studies by several sociologists of new religious movements on the role played by apostates (described as individuals that leave new religious movements to pursue opposition against their former group.) The volume examines the apostate's testimonies, their motivations, the narratives they construct to discredit their former movements, and their impact on the public controversy between such movements and society.

Reception 
The Social Science Journal refers to the book as a "superb effort to examine in depth the complexity and significance of the apostate role, and to illuminate the processes through which subversive evil is socially constructed. Taken together, the authors contribute a diverse array of theory, data and substantive insights that add to our knowledge of the inner-workings of new religious movements. I recommend this book for classes in organizations, sociology of religion, psychology of religion, group dynamics and related subjects".

The book was reviewed in the American Journal of Sociology, that found this work to be a "remarkably unified collection of high-quality essays by many leading sociologists of new religious movements."

The psychologist Michael Langone argues that some will accept uncritically the positive reports of current members without calling such reports, for example, "benevolence tales" or "personal growth tales".  He asserts that only the critical reports of ex-members are called "tales", which he considers to be a term that clearly implies falsehood or fiction.  He states that it wasn't until 1996 that a researcher conducted a study to assess the extent to which so called "atrocity tales" might be based on fact.

References 

1998 non-fiction books
Books about social constructionism
English-language books
Researchers of new religious movements and cults
Sociology books
Books by David G. Bromley